Black Horse and MIDI Dungeon are studio albums by electronic musician Vektroid under the alias esc不在, released on August 2, 2011. The albums' genre is recognized as vaporwave. These albums are some of Vektroid's more obscure work as they have never been uploaded to her Bandcamp or SoundCloud pages in their original forms. Select tracks on the albums would later be reused for Initiation Tape: Isle of Avalon Edition, a rework of the original Initiation Tape, released on the same day as the original esc不在 albums. The albums are not as popular as others, such as Floral Shoppe.

Black Horse

MIDI Dungeon

Notes
 The track "Feel" appears on Initiation Tape: Isle of Avalon Edition
 The tracks "Drive Home Thru The Stars For You" and "Willfully" were combined into the track "Sky Nouveau", which appears on Initiation Tape: Isle of Avalon Edition
 The track "Mirror Harem" appears on Initiation Tape: Isle of Avalon Edition as "Harem"
 The tracks "Forest", "Pine", and "Surf" were combined into the track "Pine Forest Surf", which appears on Initiation Tape: Isle of Avalon Edition
 The tracks "Slumber" and "Slow Rain" were combined into the track "Nimbus Lab After Hours", which appears on Initiation Tape: Isle of Avalon Edition
 The track "Asleep Together" appears on Initiation Tape: Isle of Avalon Edition as "Asleep In The Ice Cave"
 The track "Aurora 3D" appears on Initiation Tape: Isle of Avalon Edition

References

2011 albums
Vektroid albums